Northport is an unincorporated census-designated place located in the town of Mukwa, in Waupaca County, Wisconsin, United States. The community is on Wisconsin Highway 54, approximately two miles northwest from New London. As of the 2010 census, its population is 491.

Notes

Census-designated places in Wisconsin
Census-designated places in Waupaca County, Wisconsin